Prince Henry, Duke of Gloucester (Henry William Frederick Albert; 31 March 1900 – 10 June 1974), was the third son and fourth child of King George V and Queen Mary. He served as Governor-General of Australia from 1945 to 1947, the only member of the British royal family to hold the post.
 
Henry was the first son of a British monarch to be educated at school, where he excelled at sports, and went on to attend Eton College, after which he was commissioned in the 10th Royal Hussars, a regiment he hoped to command. However, his military career was frequently interrupted by royal duties, and he was nicknamed "the unknown soldier". While big-game shooting in Kenya, he met the future pilot Beryl Markham, with whom he became romantically involved. The court put pressure on him to end the relationship, but he had to pay regular hush-money to avert a public scandal. In 1935, also under parental pressure, he married Lady Alice Montagu Douglas Scott, with whom he had two sons, Princes William and Richard.

From 1939 to 1940, Henry served in France as a liaison officer to Lord Gort. He performed military and diplomatic duties during the rest of the war, then in 1945 was appointed as Australia's governor-general at the request of Prime Minister John Curtin. The post had originally been offered to his younger brother, the Duke of Kent, who died in an air crash. Henry attended the coronation of his niece Queen Elizabeth II in 1953 and carried out several overseas tours, often accompanied by his wife. From 1965, he became incapacitated by a number of strokes. Upon his death, he was succeeded as the Duke of Gloucester by his only living son, Richard.

Prince Henry was the last surviving child of King George V and Queen Mary. His widow, who died at the age of 102, became the longest-lived ever member of the British royal family.

Early life

Prince Henry was born on 31 March 1900, at York Cottage, on the Sandringham Estate during the reign of his great-grandmother Queen Victoria. His father was the Duke of York (later King George V), the only surviving son of the Prince and Princess of Wales (later King Edward VII and Queen Alexandra). His mother was the Duchess of York (later Queen Mary), the only daughter of the Duke and Duchess of Teck. At the time of his birth, he was fifth in the line of succession to the throne, behind his grandfather, father and two elder brothers.

He was baptised at the private chapel of Windsor Castle on 17 May 1900, by Randall Thomas Davidson, Bishop of Winchester, and his godparents were: Queen Victoria (his great-grandmother); the German Emperor (his first cousin once removed, for whom Prince Albert of Prussia stood proxy); Princess Henry of Battenberg (his paternal great-aunt); the Duchess of Cumberland and Teviotdale (his paternal great-aunt, whose sister, his grandmother the Princess of Wales represented her); Prince George of Greece and Denmark (his first cousin once removed, for whom Prince Henry's paternal grandfather the Prince of Wales stood proxy); Princess Carl of Denmark (his paternal aunt, for whom her sister Princess Victoria of Wales stood proxy); Prince Alexander of Teck (his maternal uncle, for whom Prince Henry's great-uncle the Duke of Cambridge stood proxy); and Field Marshal The Earl Roberts (for whom General Sir Dighton Probyn stood proxy). He was informally known to his family as Harry.

Childhood and education

As a young boy, Prince Henry suffered from ill health very much like his older brother Albert. He also had knocked knees, and had to wear painful leg splints. He was an extremely nervous child, and was often victim to spontaneous fits of crying or giggling, and also like his brother, Henry had a combination of speech disorders. They both had rhotacism, which prevented them from pronouncing the sound r, but while Albert's pronunciation was slightly reminiscent of the "French r", Henry was completely unable to pronounce it, causing the intended r to sound like [w]. On top of this, Henry also had a nasal lisp and an unusually high-pitched tone, resulting in a very distinctive voice.

By 1909, Henry's poor health had become a serious concern for his parents. He was very small for his age and was prone to get very aggressive colds. "You must remember that he is rather fragile and must be treated differently to his two elder brothers who are more robust", wrote Prince George to Henry's tutor, Henry Peter Hansell.

On 6 May 1910, Prince George ascended the throne as George V, and Henry became the third in line to the throne. The King was persuaded by Hansell that it would be good for Henry's character to attend school, where he could interact with boys his age. The King, having previously rejected this proposition for his two elder sons, agreed on the basis that it would help him "behave like a boy and not like a little child". 
Prince Henry thus became the first son of a British monarch to attend school. After three days at St Peter's Court in Broadstairs as a day boy, Hansell, noticing he liked it, asked the King to send him as a boarder, to which he agreed.

Henry spent three years at St Peter's Court. Academically, he was not very bright, although he did show a particular aptitude in mathematics. Henry's sole interest became sports, particularly cricket and football. "All you write about is your everlasting football of which I am heartily sick", wrote his mother, answering a fully detailed letter from Henry about a match.

In September 1913, Henry started at Eton College. During the First World War, Crown Prince Leopold of Belgium, later Leopold III, was a member of his house (Mr Lubbock's). His studies did not improve, but his nerves and disposition did. He made friends through his enthusiasm for sports, and his masters were very pleased with him, noting in his report that he was "thoroughly willing, cheerful, modest & obedient". To his father, these values were the most important, having no time or interest in what he called "intellectuals".

By the time he went up to Trinity College, Cambridge in 1919 with his brother Albert, Henry had outgrown all his brothers, both in height and size, and enjoyed very good health. Their stay at Cambridge lasted just one year and was very uneventful for both of them, as they were not allowed to live in college with the other undergraduates, due to their father's fear of their mixing with undesirable company.

Military career
Unlike his brothers, Prince Henry joined the Army rather than the Royal Navy. He attended the Royal Military College, Sandhurst, in 1919, and was commissioned a second lieutenant in the King's Royal Rifle Corps on 16 July 1919. On 16 July 1921 he was promoted to lieutenant in the 10th Royal Hussars, with whom he continued to serve. Though he desired to serve in more active roles as a soldier, his position as a senior member of the royal family effectively ruled out any such options. He retained an interest in sport and The Cricketer reported in August 1921 that the touring Philadelphians had had the honour of being presented to Prince Henry at The Oval.

Prince Henry was promoted to captain on 11 May 1927, and was appointed a personal aide-de-camp to his father on 2 August 1929. On 3 March 1931, he was appointed a staff captain and was seconded for service with the 2nd Cavalry Brigade. He was brevetted to major on 2 August 1934, and upon his father's Silver Jubilee the following May, was appointed Colonel-in-Chief of the Gloucestershire Regiment. On 6 July 1935, he was promoted to the substantive rank of major, his final rank as an actively serving officer. On 23 June 1936, he was appointed a personal aide-de-camp to his eldest brother, Edward VIII.

Following his brother's abdication and the accession of his brother the Duke of York as George VI, Prince Henry was effectively retired from active duty, and received a ceremonial promotion to major-general on 1 January 1937, skipping three ranks. He continued to serve as a personal aide-de-camp to the new King, receiving this appointment on 1 February. On 12 March, he received the colonelcy of his former regiment, the 10th Royal Hussars, along with the colonelcies of the Royal Inniskilling Fusiliers and the Gordon Highlanders. On 28 May, he received an honorary appointment as a captain in the Royal Naval Volunteer Reserve (RNVR), followed by his appointment on 10 November to the honorary colonelcies of the Ceylon Planters' Rifle Corps and the Ceylon Light Infantry (now the Sri Lanka Light Infantry).

Following the outbreak of World War II, he joined the British Expeditionary Force, and was appointed as a Chief Liaison Officer on 4 September 1939. In January 1940, he was appointed to the colonelcies of the Ulster Anti-Aircraft Regiments, the Royal Artillery, and the Territorial Army. He was slightly wounded in 1940 when his staff car was attacked from the air. In August 1940, he was appointed Chief Liaison Officer, GHQ Home Forces. He also became second-in-command of the 20th Armoured Brigade that year, and was promoted to lieutenant-general on 17 September 1941. On 27 October 1944, he was promoted to the rank of full general.

He was appointed a Field Marshal in 1955 and a Marshal of the Royal Air Force in 1958.

Duke of Gloucester

On 31 March 1928, his father created him Duke of Gloucester, Earl of Ulster, and Baron Culloden, three titles that linked him with three parts of the United Kingdom, namely England, Northern Ireland, and Scotland. Prince Henry visited Canada in 1928.

Before his marriage, Prince Henry's greatest ambition was to someday command his regiment, the 10th Royal Hussars, or at least spend as much time in the army as possible. Although he was a capable soldier, as the King's son he was prevented from joining his regiment abroad, and this meant he was generally seen as an outsider to his fellow officers. To his increasing despair, he had to fulfill the many royal duties his father assigned him.

In September 1928, Henry left England with his brother Edward, Prince of Wales, to shoot big game in Africa. The brothers parted in Nairobi, where Henry was to stay for a while. There, he was entertained by Mansfield Markham and his wife Beryl Markham. Beryl and Henry soon started an affair (though sources differ over when the affair started; many say it was not until her visit to England). In November, the brothers were recalled to England due to their father's worsening health, and soon after Beryl returned too. At the Grosvenor Hotel, close to Buckingham Palace, the affair continued with Prince Henry openly hosting parties with her in her suite and drinking too much.

The affair, widely known by the London society, shocked the Queen, to the delight of the Prince of Wales who remarked that "for once, Queen Mary's blue-eyed boy was in trouble instead of himself". The King stepped in, thinking that keeping Henry busy would be the best way to end the affair, as would keeping him from drinking too much, too often. That year, he arranged a series of tours for his son to undertake.

In 1929, he went to Japan to confer the Garter on the Emperor, and a year later he attended the coronation of Haile Selassie of Ethiopia in Addis Ababa. In 1934 George V made him a Knight of St Patrick, Ireland's chivalric order. It was the second to last time this order was awarded (the last appointment being the Duke of York, later George VI, in 1936); at the time of his death, the Duke of Gloucester was the only remaining knight. In 1934, he went to Australia and New Zealand where the people received him with overwhelming enthusiasm that one journalist wrote, "(amounted) to something very near adoration".

He represented Queen Elizabeth II during the Malayan Declaration of Independence on 31 August 1957.

Marriage and family

When he returned from his trip to Japan in 1929, the affair with Markham ended. Her husband wanted a divorce and threatened to disclose Prince Henry's private letters to his wife if he did not "take care of Beryl". The Duke and Beryl never met again, although she did write to him when he visited Kenya in 1950 with his wife, but he did not write back. Prince Henry's solicitors paid out an annuity until her death in 1985.

After his tour of Australia and New Zealand, and pressured by his parents, Prince Henry decided it was time to settle down and proposed to Lady Alice Montagu Douglas Scott, sister of one of Henry's best friends Lord William Montagu Douglas Scott. The proposal, wrote Lady Alice many years later, was not at all romantic as "it was not his way", instead he just "mumbled it as we were on a walk one day".
They were married on 6 November 1935. The marriage was originally planned to take place at Westminster Abbey, but was moved to the more modest Private Chapel at Buckingham Palace due to the death of Lady Alice's father, on 19 October 1935, barely a fortnight before the wedding. After suffering two miscarriages, the Duchess of Gloucester gave birth to two sons:
 Prince William of Gloucester (18 December 1941 – 28 August 1972)
 Prince Richard, Duke of Gloucester (born 26 August 1944). He married a Danish commoner, Birgitte van Deurs, on 8 July 1972. The couple later had three children.

The couple lived first at the Royal Pavilion in Aldershot, near the barracks of the Duke's regiment. "It was a very simple cabin" recalled the Duchess of Gloucester, and "the only royal thing about it was my husband's presence". After his father's death, the Duke bought Barnwell Manor in 1938. As their London seat, they were given York House in St James's Palace.

Abdication of Edward VIII
In December 1936, Henry's brother Edward VIII abdicated the throne to marry divorcée Wallis Simpson. His brother, Prince Albert, ascended the throne as King George VI. Although third in line to the throne, following his two nieces Princesses Elizabeth and Margaret, Henry became the first adult in line, meaning he would act as regent if anything were to happen to the King before Princess Elizabeth came of age on 21 April 1944, her 18th birthday. Because of this, Prince Henry could not leave the UK at the same time as the King. Furthermore, he and his younger brother, the Duke of Kent, had to increase their royal engagements considerably to support the new King.

Edward VIII, who became Duke of Windsor after abdicating, recalled that it was Henry who reacted least to the news of his abdication. The brothers had never been close and, apart from horses, they had not much in common. But Edward did admit regretting the implications the abdication would have on "The Unknown Soldier", a nickname he teasingly used to refer to Henry, owing to his low profile.

The abrupt change in Prince Henry's somewhat carefree life up to that point was made clear by the new King on the very first evening of his reign. "If you two think that, now that I have taken this new job on, you can go on behaving just as you like, in the same old way, you are very much mistaken! You two have to pull yourselves together", the King warned his two younger brothers at dinner.

Although the Duke of Gloucester supported his brother, and later his niece, tirelessly and dutifully, he had a fondness for whisky. On one occasion, Queen Mary wrote to the Duchess suggesting that if they were planning to visit, the Duke should bring his own supply of whisky, "as we have not got much left, and it is so expensive". Even Noble Frankland, who wrote the Duke's biography after his death at the request and under the supervision of the Duchess, wrote that: "He did not eschew a glass of whisky ... or the occasional blasphemous oath."

King George VI had great affection for his younger brother. Circumstances had made them closer following the abdication, and the King trusted Prince Henry with important matters, which he dutifully undertook. Sometimes, though, the organised King found his brother's less systematic manner irritating. On one occasion after a day of shooting at Balmoral Castle, the King found a mistake on his shot-game record, where there seemed to be a pair of grouse missing. A member of staff suggested that the King call and ask the Duke of Gloucester, who was staying at Birkhall. When the Duke confirmed he had taken the birds, the King's gruff warning to his brother that he should never again take birds without telling him surprised the member of staff.

Second World War
After the outbreak of World War II, the Duke of Gloucester, as Chief Liaison Officer to Lord Gort, spent almost the entire first year of the war in France. Besides boosting the troops' morale, he was useful as a first-hand witness of the situation; he reported to government officials and to the King, to whom he continually wrote detailed and objective accounts of what was happening. Always eager to get involved, the Duke often found himself in dangerous situations, but did not seem overly worried. "Motoring about is not nice as many villages are being bombed", he wrote to his wife in his usual straightforward and dismissive manner. The Duke's two narrowest escapes both came in May 1940.

Having known King Leopold III of Belgium from school days, the Duke wanted to meet him personally to offer support after rumours began circulating that Belgium would surrender to Germany. On 14 May, he and his brother-in-law, Lord William Scott, drove from Hotel Univers in Arras into Belgium to see the King of the Belgians at a secret location. That night, Hotel Univers was bombed, resulting in several deaths, including those staying in the rooms next to the Duke's. The Duke wrote to his brother that King Leopold was "very depressed". As the Duke and Lord William Scott drove back, they were caught up in heavy enemy bombing in Tournai, where their car caught fire. They managed to get out and dive into an alleyway, although not unscathed as the Duke needed medical attention for a profusely bleeding wound.

Although generally optimistic, Prince Henry did sometimes suffer from bouts of depression during his service in 1940, especially at the end of his occasional leaves. "My beloved Alice, I did hate leaving you yesterday so very much that I could hardly keep a straight face", he wrote to his wife after reporting back. The strains of living at the French front also diminished his resolve at times: "I think I hate this country and war more than ever... it is such an awful waste of everything", he told the Duchess.

In June, after the fall of Dunkirk, the Duke was ordered back to England by an embarrassed General Headquarters, which had not been able to assure the King's brother's safety. "Wherever I went or had been, I was bombed", the Duke explained to his mother, amused.

In early 1942 the King arranged a four-month-long military and diplomatic mission for the Duke to the Middle East, India, and East Africa. The mission came just after Prince Henry had become a father for the first time, and it was considered a dangerous trip, as the Germans were rapidly advancing toward some of the territories the Duke would visit. The King even wrote to his sister-in-law that he would act as guardian of the newly born Prince William if anything should happen to his brother.

After Prince Henry's younger brother, the Duke of Kent, died in a plane crash in Scotland in August 1942, it was decided that the Duke of Gloucester would not be sent on any further missions that could prove dangerous.

Governor-General of Australia

In late 1944 the Duke was unexpectedly appointed Governor-General of Australia after the death in 1942 of his younger brother, the Duke of Kent, who had previously been offered the position.

The Duke had made a successful visit to Australia in 1934. Because the Duke was shy, he sometimes appeared stiff and formal, but he and the Duchess travelled widely in Australia using his own plane during their time in office. When Prime Minister Curtin died in 1945, the Duke appointed Frank Forde as prime minister.

Gloucester left Australia in March 1947, after two years in the post, due to the need to act as Senior Counsellor of State during a visit by George VI and Princesses Elizabeth and Margaret to South Africa. As a parting gift, he left his own plane for use by the government and people of Australia.

Later life

In May 1949, May 1961, May 1962, and May 1963, the Duke served in the office of Lord High Commissioner to the General Assembly of the Church of Scotland, which temporarily afforded him precedence in Scotland immediately below the King and Queen.

The Duke attended the coronation of his niece Elizabeth II in 1953. Both the Duke and Duchess carried out royal engagements, including several overseas tours. In 1954 the Duke served as the Treasurer of the Honourable Society of Gray's Inn. He suffered a series of strokes in later years; his first was in 1965 while he and his wife, Alice, were returning from Sir Winston Churchill's funeral ceremony in their vehicle, which resulted in a car crash. This, together with later strokes, left him dependent on a wheelchair, and he was unable to speak in his last remaining years. His last public appearance was at the unveiling of Queen Mary's plaque at Marlborough House in 1967, where he appeared weak and considerably older than the Duke of Windsor. In 1972, he was too ill to attend the funeral of the Duke of Windsor in May, or the wedding of his younger son, Prince Richard, in July. In August, the Duke's elder son, Prince William, died in a plane crash; by that point, he was in such poor health that his wife hesitated about whether to tell him. She later wrote in her memoirs that she did not, but that he may have learned of their son's death from television coverage.

Death
He died on 10 June 1974 at the age of 74. He was the last surviving child of King George V and Queen Mary. His body was buried in the Royal Burial Ground, Frogmore.

His will was sealed in London after his death in 1981. His estate was valued at £734,262 (or £5.6 million in 2022 when adjusted for inflation).

His second, and only living, son, Prince Richard, inherited the title of Duke of Gloucester. The Duke's widow, Alice, received permission from Queen Elizabeth II to be styled Princess Alice, Duchess of Gloucester, to distinguish herself from Prince Richard's wife. She outlived her husband by 30 years until her death on 29 October 2004, becoming, at age 102, the longest-lived member of the British royal family in history.

Titles, styles, honours and arms

Titles and styles
1900–1901: His Royal Highness Prince Henry of York
1901: His Royal Highness Prince Henry of Cornwall and York
1901–1910: His Royal Highness Prince Henry of Wales
1910–1928: His Royal Highness The Prince Henry
1928–1974: His Royal Highness The Duke of Gloucester

Honours
 KG: Knight of the Order of the Garter (1921)
 KT: Knight of the Order of the Thistle (1933)
 KP: Knight of the Order of St Patrick (1934)
 GCB: Great Master and Principal Knight Grand Cross of the Order of the Bath (1942)
 GCMG: Knight Grand Cross of the Order of St Michael and St George (1935)
 GCVO: Knight Grand Cross of the Royal Victorian Order (1922)
 GCStJ: Grand Prior of the Order of St John (1939)
 ADC: Personal aide-de-camp (1929)
 Royal Victorian Chain (1932)
  Grand Cross with Collar of the Order of St. Olav (20 December 1924)
  Grand Cordon of the Order of the Chrysanthemum (1921); Collar (1929)
  Knight of the Order of the Elephant (24 June 1924)
  Grand Cross of the Legion of Honour (May 1927)
  Knight of the Order of the Royal House of Chakri (17 July 1939)
  Knight of the Order of the Seraphim (8 June 1956)
  Grand Cross of the Order of Merit of the Italian Republic (9 May 1958)

Military
Colonel in Chief, Gloucestershire Regiment
Colonel in Chief, Royal Inniskilling Fusiliers
Colonel, Ceylon Light Infantry (1937)
Colonel, Scots Guards (1937)
Colonel in Chief, Royal Army Service Corps
Colonel in Chief, Royal Corps of Transport

Arms
In 1921, Prince Henry was granted a personal coat of arms, being the royal arms, differenced by a label argent of three points, the centre bearing a lion rampant gules, and the outer points crosses gules.

Ancestry

Notes

External links 

Australian Dictionary of Biography

10th Royal Hussars officers
1900 births
1974 deaths
19th-century British people
20th-century British people
Bailiffs Grand Cross of the Order of St John
Barons Culloden
British Army personnel of World War II
British field marshals
British landowners
British people of German descent
British princes
Burials at the Royal Burial Ground, Frogmore
Children of George V
Dukes of Gloucester
Earls of Ulster (1928 creation)
Gloucester
Graduates of the Royal Military College, Sandhurst
Grand Croix of the Légion d'honneur
Grand Crosses 1st class of the Order of Merit of the Federal Republic of Germany
Great Masters of the Order of the Bath
Henry, Duke of Gloucester
King's Royal Rifle Corps officers
Knights Grand Cross of the Order of Merit of the Italian Republic
Knights Grand Cross of the Order of St Michael and St George
Knights Grand Cross of the Royal Victorian Order
Knights of St Patrick
Knights of the Garter
Knights of the Thistle
Lords High Commissioner to the General Assembly of the Church of Scotland
Marshals of the Royal Air Force
Members of the Privy Council of the United Kingdom
Military personnel from Norfolk
Peers created by George V
People educated at St Peter's Court
People from Sandringham, Norfolk
People of the Victorian era
Presidents of the Football Association
Henry, Duke of Gloucester, Prince
Sons of emperors
Sons of kings